Seats of the Catholicos of Armenians is the list of the seats of the Catholicos of Armenians

See also 
Catholicos of All Armenians

References 

Catholicoi of Armenia